The Ozark Conference is a high school athletic conference represented by 11 schools in the southwest portion of Missouri.  As the name implies, all eleven schools are in the Ozarks region of the state and all are among the biggest in the region (only West Plains and Hillcrest are not Class 5 in basketball).  The conference offers championships for girls in Basketball, Cross Country, Golf, Soccer, Softball, Swimming & Diving, Tennis, Track & Field, and Volleyball.  In boys sports, the conference offers championships in Baseball, Basketball, Cross Country, Football, Golf, Soccer, Swimming & Diving, Tennis, Track & Field, and Wrestling.

The conference features All five of the public schools in Springfield and also the large central public schools in Rolla, Lebanon, and West Plains. Camdenton High School is the central school at the Lake of the Ozarks while Waynesville High School is the main high school for the military communities around the large Fort Leonard Wood army post, including Waynesville and St. Robert.

List of member schools

As of the 2017/18 School year Joplin HS has swapped conferences to the COC. Replacing Joplin is former OC member Central.

Bolivar High School applied to join the OC after the COC Small Division dissolved–leaving Bolivar as an independent school.  November 5, 2019, it was announced that Bolivar's football program would enter the Ozark Conference in 2020, replacing Central. Central will become an independent in football but remain in the OC in other sports. Bolivar will be a "football only" school in the OC and their other sports programs will remain independent. As of March 2020 Bolivar has been approved as a full member of the conference and will compete in all sports.

References

External links
 Conference website

High school sports conferences and leagues in the United States
Missouri high school athletic conferences